The Tseng Lung (Zeng Long) Hui-Kuan were Malaysian associations for people from Zengcheng and Longmen counties of Guangzhou prefecture in South China.
 Tseng Lung Hui Kuan, Penang, founded in 1886 by Capitan China Chung Keng Quee
 Tseng Lung Hui Kuan, Market Road, Taiping, Perak, founded in 1885 by Capitan China Chung Keng Quee
 Tseng Lung Hui Kuan, Gopeng, Perak, founded in 1885 by Capitan China Chung Keng Quee

Ethnic organisations based in Malaysia